K. Kessel FC is a Belgian association football club team, which is based in Kessel. The club is playing in the lower Belgian football leagues. The club's teamcolours are yellow and blue. The homeshirt of the season 2007/2008

KFC Kessel plays its games in the 'Herman Welters Stadion', which has a capacity of 100, wearing yellow shirts with a blue stripe.

The club is founded in 1926.

Season 2007/2008 

The 1st team of KFC Kessel ended 14th in competition with 16 teams.

References

External links 
 Official website

Football clubs in Belgium
Association football clubs established in 1926
1926 establishments in Belgium